Kõrgessaare Parish was a rural municipality in the north-west of Hiiu County, Estonia. In 2013 it was merged with the town of Kärdla to form a new Hiiu Parish.

Settlements
There was 1 small borough Kõrgessaare and 58 villages: Heigi, Heiste, Heistesoo, Hirmuste, Hüti, Isabella, Jõeranna, Jõesuu, Kalana, Kaleste, Kanapeeksi, Kauste, Kidaste, Kiduspe, Kiivera, Kodeste, Koidma, Kopa, Kõpu, Kurisu, Laasi, Lauka, Lehtma, Leigri, Lilbi, Luidja, Mägipe, Malvaste, Mangu, Mardihansu, Meelste, Metsaküla, Mudaste, Napi, Nõmme, Ogandi, Ojaküla, Otste, Palli, Paope, Pihla, Poama, Puski, Reigi, Risti, Rootsi, Sigala, Sülluste, Suurepsi, Suureranna, Tahkuna, Tammistu, Tiharu, Ülendi, Viita, Viitasoo, Vilima, Villamaa.

References

External links

Former municipalities of Estonia
Hiiu County